Christ Church United Reformed Church is a grade II listed United Reformed Church at Chase Side, Enfield, London.

References

External links

http://www.ccurc.org.uk/

Enfield, London
Churches in the London Borough of Enfield
Buildings and structures in the London Borough of Enfield
United Reformed churches in London
Grade II listed churches in London